The 2018 Spring United Premier Soccer League season was the 10th season of the UPSL.

In some parts of the country, UPSL is organized into Pro Premier and Championships Divisions with promotion and relegation between the Pro Premier division and the Championship Division. The 2018 Spring UPSL season had 136 clubs participate in the Pro Premier divisions and 28 clubs participate in the Championship divisions.

The overall structure of the League by Conference and roughly from west to east is represented in the table below

Central Conference
The Central Conference is new for this season. It was split geographically into two divisions.

North Division
The North Division covers the state of Oklahoma, as well as North Texas. The division will play an 8 game home-and-away double round robin.

The following 5 clubs joined the division for its inaugural season
Dallas Elite FC
Inocentes FC — joined from Fort Worth Premier League
Keene FC — new team
OKC 1889 FC — new team
Texas Spurs — new team

North Division Standings

South Division
The South Division covers South Texas. It will play an 8 game home-and-away double round robin.

The following 5 clubs joined the division for its inaugural season
Atletico Katy — new team
FC Knights — joined from Texas Premier Soccer League
ISL USA FC
Round Rock SC — new team
Samba FC San Antonio — joined from  Texas Premier Soccer League and rebranded from Genova FC San Antonio

South Division Standings

Central Conference Playoffs
The 1st place team in each division will host the 2nd place team in the other division. The two winners will meet in the championship, hosted by the team with the most points.

Inocentes FC advance to the National Playoffs.

Colorado Conference

Pro Premier
The division will play an 8 game home-or-away single round robin.

The following 2 clubs left the division before the season -
Club El Azul — folded
FC United — folded

The following 3 clubs joined the division before the season -
Denver Metro FC — promoted from Championship Division
GAM United FC — promoted from Championship Division
Northern Colorado FC — promoted from Championship Division

Pro Premier Standings

Pro Premier Playoffs

FC Boulder advance to the National Playoffs.

Championship
The division will play a 10 game home-and-away double round robin.

The following 4 clubs left the division before the season
Denver Metro FC — promoted to Pro Premier Division
GAM United FC — promoted to Pro Premier Division
Legions FC — folded
Northern Colorado FC — promoted to Pro Premier Division

The following 5 clubs joined the division before the season
Athletic Club of Sloan's Lake — joined from Colorado Premier League
Bright Stars of Colorado SC — new team
Longmont Diablos FC — joined from local amateur league
Monaco Denver FC — joined from Colorado Premier League
Real Medina PSL — joined from local amateur league

Championship Standings

Midwest Conference
The Midwest Conference is new for this season. It was founded through a merger with the Premier League of America. The conference was split geographically into four divisions.

Central Division
The Central Division covers the states of Illinois and Iowa. It will play a 10 game home-and-away double round robin.

The following 6 clubs joined the division for its inaugural season
Aurora Borealis SC — joined from Premier League of America
DeKalb County United — new team
Elgin Pumas SC — joined from Premier League of America
Joliet United SC — new team
RWB Adria — joined from Premier League of America
Union Dubuque FC — new team

Central Division Standings

East Division
The East Division covers the states of Indiana, Michigan, and Ohio. It will play a 10 game home-and-away double round robin.

The following 6 clubs joined the division for its inaugural season
AAFC Lumberjacks — joined from local amateur competition
Carpathia FC — joined from Premier League of America
Muskegon Risers SC — joined from Premier League of America
Oakland County FC — joined from Premier League of America
Toledo Villa FC — joined from Premier League of America
USAi Old Bhoys — new team

East Division Standings

North Division
The North Division covers the states of Minnesota and Wisconsin.

The following 6 clubs joined the division for its inaugural season
Croatian Eagles SC — joined from Premier League of America
FC Minneapolis — joined from American Champions League
Granite City FC — joined from American Champions League
Green Bay United
Madison 56ers — joined from Premier League of America
Milwaukee Bavarian SC — joined from Premier League of America

North Division Standings

West Division
The West Division covers the states of Kansas, Missouri, and Nebraska.

The following 5 clubs joined the division for its inaugural season
Barilleros FC — joined from local amateur league
Nebraska Bugeaters FC — new team
Quinto Elemento FC — joined from local amateur league
Santa Fe Wanderers — joined from local amateur league
St. Louis Maritsa — joined from local amateur league

West Division Standings

Midwest Conference Playoffs
The regular season champions of each division advanced directly to the conference playoffs. All games were hosted at the Bavarian Soccer Complex, home of Milwaukee Bavarian SC. The semi-finals were seeded based on each participant's points-per-game average.

Milwaukee Bavarian SC advance to the National Playoffs.

Mountain Conference
The Mountain Conference is new for this season. It was formed from the Idaho and Utah clubs from the Desert Mountain Conference. The conference will play a 10 game home-and-away double round robin.

The following Utah club left the Desert Mountain Conference before the season
San Juan FC — folded

The following 6 clubs joined the conference for its inaugural season
Boise Cutthroats FC — transferred from Desert Mountain Conference
Idaho Lobos FC
Magic Valley FC — returned from 1 season hiatus
Provo Premier — transferred from Desert Mountain Conference
San Juan FC — transferred from Desert Mountain Conference
Utah Saints FC — new team

Mountain Conference standings

Mountain Conference Playoffs

Boise Cutthroats FC advance to the National Playoffs.

Northeast Conference
The Northeast Conference is new for this season. It was split geographically into two divisions.

American Division
The American Division covers the states of Maryland, New Jersey, New York, and Pennsylvania.

The following 8 clubs joined the division for its inaugural season
Catrachos De INCAEF — new team
First Touch Elite Soccer
Junior Lone Star FC II — reserve team of National Premier Soccer League club
New Jersey Teamsters FC — new team
Rochester Super 9 Pro FC — new team
Screaming Eagles FC
SGFC Eagles — joined from American Soccer League
Upper Darby FC — joined from CASA Soccer League

American Division Standings

American Division Playoffs
All games will be played at Marina Auto Stadium, home of Rochester Super 9 Pro SC.

Rochester Super 9 Pro SC advance to the Northeast Conference Playoffs.

Patriot Division
The Patriot Division covers the states of Massachusetts, New Hampshire, and Rhode Island.

The following 9 clubs joined the division for its inaugural season
Boston Siege FC — joined from Champions Soccer League USA
International SC — new team
Juve-Pro Soccer — joined from New England Luso American Soccer Association
Lincoln Club Futebol — joined from Champions Soccer League USA
Lynn United — joined from Champions Soccer League USA
Mass United FC — joined from American Soccer League
New Hampshire Rapids FC — joined from Champions Soccer League USA
Safira FC — joined from Champions Soccer League USA
Unations FC — joined from Bay State Soccer League

Patriot Division Standings

Patriot Division Playoffs

Mass United FC advance to the Northeast Conference Playoffs.

Northeast Conference Playoffs
Rochester Super 9 Pro SC, as the division champion with the most regular season points per game, will host.

Mass United FC advance to the National Playoffs.

Southeast Conference
The Southeast Conference is new for this season. It absorbed the South Florida Conference as its Florida South Division, and then added three addition divisions with all new teams.

Atlanta Caribbean Division
The Atlanta Caribbean Division was founded through a merger with the Atlanta Caribbean Soccer League. It overlaps geographically with the Mid-Atlantic Division, with all games taking place at the Southeast Sports Compelex in Lithonia, GA.

The following 8 clubs joined the division for its inaugural season
Atlanta Generals FC
FC Stone Mountain
Inferno FC — joined from Atlanta Caribbean Soccer League
Reno United — joined from Atlanta Caribbean Soccer League
Sambo FC — joined from Atlanta Caribbean Soccer League
Seas Jamaica FC — joined from Atlanta Caribbean Soccer League
VaHi Atletic FC — joined from Atlanta Caribbean Soccer League
Yardaz FC — joined from Atlanta Caribbean Soccer League

Atlanta Caribbean Division Standings

Florida Central Division
The following 10 clubs joined the division for its inaugural season
America SC — new team
Clay County SC — new team
Deportivo Lake Mary — joined from Orlando Premier Soccer League
Internacional USA — new affiliate team of Brazilian club
Inter Orlando FC — new team
Golden Goal Sports SC — new team
Macca Ballers FC
Sporting Orlando — joined from Central Florida Soccer League
St. Petersburg FC Aztecs — joined from Florida Suncoast Soccer League
Winter Haven United FC — joined from Champions Soccer League USA and rebranded from Sisonke Simunye - Together We Are 1

Florida Central Division Standings

Florida Central Division Playoffs

America SC advance to the Southeast Conference Playoffs.

Florida South Division
The following 2 clubs left the South Florida Conference before the season
FC Ginga — folded
Plantation FC — folded

The following 12 clubs joined the division before the season
Broncos United FC — transferred from South Florida Conference
Fullersfield FC Lions — joined from local amateur competition
Florida Soccer Soldiers — new team
Hebraica Miami FC
Hialeah City FC — transferred from South Florida Conference
Hurricane FC — joined from American Premier Soccer League
Jupiter United SC — joined from American Premier Soccer League
Miami Dade FC — transferred from South Florida Conference
Miami Sun FC
Miami Wolves FC — transferred from South Florida Conference
Pinecrest SC — new team
West Park FC — transferred from South Florida Conference

Florida South Division Standings

Florida South Division Playoffs

Florida Soccer Soldiers advance to the Southeast Conference Playoffs.

Mid-Atlantic Division
The Mid-Atlantic Division covers the states of Georgia, North Carolina, South Carolina, and Virginia. The division will play a 14 game home-and-away double round robin.

The following 8 clubs joined the division for its inaugural season
Atlanta ASA FC — joined from Atlanta Caribbean Soccer League
Bragg FC — joined from local amateur league
Broncos United FC NC — second team of Broncos United FC of Florida South Division
C-Ville FC — new team
FC Cardinals — new team
Lowcountry United FC — joined from Charleston Soccer League
Savannah Clovers FC — new team
Sparta 20/20 FC — new team

Mid-Atlantic Division Standings

Southeast Conference Playoffs
The champions of the Florida Central and Florida South divisions played at Ives Estates Park, home of Florida Soccer Soldiers. The champions of the Mid-Atlantic and Atlanta Caribbean divisions were originally to play at the neutral location of Spartanburg Day School, home of Sparta 20/20 FC. That match was abandoned due to lightning and was rescheduled for West Orange High School, home of America SC, immediately before the conference final at the same venue.

Florida Soccer Soldiers advance to the National Playoffs.

Southwest Conference
The Southwest Conference is new for this season. It was formed from the Arizona clubs from the Desert Mountain Conference, and also includes New Mexico and West Texas. The conference was originally going to contain Nevada clubs as well, but ultimately none competed in this season.

The following 3 Nevada clubs left the Desert Mountain Conference before the season
Las Vegas City FC — folded
Las Vegas Mobsters — folded
Las Vegas Soccer Club — folded

The following 6 clubs joined the conference for its inaugural season
Arizona Scorpions — returned from 1 season hiatus
FC Grande — joined from Mesilla Valley Soccer League 
MSC United — new team
Southwest FC — new team
Sporting AZ FC — transferred from Desert Mountain Conference
Sporting AZ FC II — new reserve team of Sporting AZ FC

Southwest Conference standings

Southwest Conference Playoffs

Sporting AZ FC advance to the National Playoffs.

Western Conference

SoCal Division

Pro Premier
The following 6 clubs left the division before the season
Anaheim Legacy FC — relegated to Championship Division
Bell Gardens FC — relegated to Championship Division
Orange County FC 2 — hiatus, due to Spring NPSL season
San Diego Zest FC 2 — hiatus, due to Spring PDL season
Strikers FC South Coast — folded
Vanquish FC — folded

The following 5 clubs joined the division before the season
Lionside FC — promoted from Championship Division
Newcastle United FC — promoted from Championship Division
Ontario Fury II — new outdoor team of Major Arena Soccer League club
Panamerican FC — promoted from Championship Division
San Diego Premier Pros FC

The following 2 clubs rebranded before the season
California United FC II — rebranded from OC Invicta.
L.A. Galaxy OC PSC — rebranded from PSC Football Club

Pro Premier Standings

Pro Premier Playoffs

Championship
The following 12 clubs left the division before the season
Atlas FC USA — folded
Black Gold Oil FC — folded
Del Rey City SC — folded
L.A. Wolves FC Reserves — folded
Lionside FC — promoted to Pro Premier Division
Long Beach City FC — folded
Newcastle United FC — promoted to Pro Premier Division
Pacific Side FC — folded
Panamerican FC — promoted to Pro Premier Division
San Fernando Valley FC — folded
Strikers FC SC Reserves — folded
United Football Academy Hawks — folded

The following 14 clubs joined the division before the season
Anaheim FC
Anaheim Legacy FC — relegated from Pro Premier Division
Bell Gardens FC — relegated from Pro Premier Division
Disciples FC
High Desert FC — new team
Inland Empire FC — returned from 2 season hiatus
Kern County Mustangs FC — new team
L.A. Galaxy OC PSC II — second team of Pro Premier club
La Habra City FC — returned from 2 season hiatus
MX Dream Soccer Club
Revolution FC
San Nicolas FC — returned from 1 season hiatus
USA/MEX SoCal
USA Soccer Stars FC — returned from 1 season hiatus

Championship Standings

Championship Playoffs

Wild West Division
For this season, the Red and Blue divisions were merged into a single Wild West Division as a part of the Western Conference. The division was expanded to include the state of Oregon. It will play a 12 game home-or-away single round robin.

The following 4 clubs left the Wild West Conference before the season
Azteca FC — folded
CD Aguiluchos USA U23 — folded
FC Sacramento — folded
Oakland Pamperos — folded

The following 7 clubs joined the division before the season
AFC San Francisco Hearts — new team
Chico City Rangers FC — joined from Pacific Premier League
Napa Sporting SC — joined from NorCal Liga
Redding Royals FC — joined from Pacific Premier League
San Leandro United FC
Southern Oregon Starphire FC — joined from Pacific Premier League
Visalia Golden Bears

The following 2 clubs rebranded before the season
East Bay FC Tecos Fire rebranded from East Bay FC Stompers Juniors
Nevada Coyotes FC rebranded from Western Nevada FC

Wild West Division Standings

Wild West Division Cup
Concurrently with the season, all Wild West Division teams except for Visalia Golden Bears took part in a knockout competition.

Wild West Division Playoffs

Western Conference Playoffs

Santa Ana Winds FC advance to the National Playoffs.

National Playoffs
The national playoffs will be played in Arvada, Colorado and Lakewood, Colorado on August 10–12, hosted by Athletic Club of Sloan's Lake. Teams were randomly paired by draw on July 30.

Qualified teams:
Central Conference: Inocentes FC
Colorado Conference: FC Boulder
Midwest Conference: Milwaukee Bavarian SC
Mountain Conference: Boise Cutthroats FC
Northeast Conference: Mass United FC
Southeast Conference: Florida Soccer Soldiers
Southwest Conference: Sporting AZ FC
Western Conference: Santa Ana Winds FC

References

United Premier Soccer League seasons
2018 in American soccer leagues